Bardneshandeh or Bard Neshandeh may refer to:
 Bardneshandeh, Izeh
 Bardneshandeh, Masjed Soleyman
 Bardneshandeh Cheshmeh-ye Aynean, Masjed Soleyman County